is one of 9 wards of Kobe, Japan. As of February 1, 2012, it has an area of 30.0 km², and a population of 166,324, with 71,745 households.

There is a white sandy beach in this ward, which attracts tourists to the Kansai region for sun bathing and popular events during the summer season. The beach is also a location in the Japanese literary classics Ise Monogatari, Genji Monogatari, and Heike Monogatari. Suma is often referred as an utamakura or meisho'', and is mentioned frequently in waka, and in Noh, Kabuki and Bunraku dramas.
Nowadays, people mainly live in Myodani, Myohoji and other northern parts of the ward.
Myōdani Station is a major station in western Kobe.

Places of interest
 Suma Rikyu Park
 Suma Public Aquarium

Notable people
 Shintaro Ishihara - Governor of Tokyo
 Yone Suzuki - businesswoman, lived in Suma-ku before 1927
Nobu Jo - social worker, founder of a suicide prevention campaign in Suma

See also
 Japanese cruiser Suma
 Japanese gunboat Suma
 Kobe child murders
 Myōdani Station

References

External links

  

Wards of Kobe